Attorney General Griffin may refer to:

John Bowes Griffin (1903–1992), Attorney General of Hong Kong
Trevor Griffin (1940–2015), Attorney General of South Australia